The 1902 Oregon Webfoots football team represented the University of Oregon as an independent during the 1902 college football season. It was the Webfoots' ninth season. They were led by head coach Marion Dolph, and they finished the season with a record of three wins, one loss and three ties (3–1–3).

Schedule

References

Oregon
Oregon Ducks football seasons
Oregon Webfoots football